Commuter rail services in the United States, Canada, Cuba, Mexico, Panama, and Costa Rica provide common carrier passenger transportation along railway tracks, with scheduled service on fixed routes on a non-reservation basis, primarily for short-distance (local) travel between a central business district and adjacent suburbs and regional travel between cities of a conurbation. It does not include rapid transit or light rail service.

Services
Many, but not all, newer commuter railways offer service during peak times only, with trains into the central business district during morning rush hour and returning to the outer areas during the evening rush hour. This mode of operation is, in many cases, simplified by ending the train with a special passenger carriage (referred to as a cab car), which has an operating cab and can control the locomotive remotely, to avoid having to turn the train around at each end of its route. Other systems avoid the problem entirely by using bi-directional multiple units.

Other commuter rail services, many of them older, long-established ones, operate seven days a week, with service from early morning to after midnight. On these systems, patrons use the trains not just to get to and from work or school, but also for attending sporting events, concerts, theatre, and the like. Some also provide service to popular weekend getaway spots and recreation areas. The Long Island Rail Road (LIRR) is the only commuter railroad that operates 24 hours a day, 7 days a week in North America.

Almost all commuter rail services in North America are operated by government entities or quasi-governmental organizations. Most share tracks or rights-of-way used by longer-distance passenger services (e.g. Amtrak, Via Rail), freight trains, or other commuter services. The  electrified Northeast Corridor in the United States is shared by commuter trains and Amtrak's Acela Express, regional, and intercity trains.

Commuter rail operators often sell reduced-price multiple-trip tickets (such as a monthly or weekly pass), charge specific station-to-station fares, and have one or two railroad stations in the central business district. Commuter trains typically connect to metro or bus services at their destination and along their route.

After the completion of SEPTA Regional Rail's Center City Commuter Connection in 1981, which allowed through-running between two formerly separate radial networks, the term "regional rail" began to be used to refer to commuter rail (and sometimes even larger heavy rail and light rail) systems that offer bidirectional all-day service and may provide useful connections between suburbs and edge cities, rather than merely transporting workers to a central business district. This is different from the European use of "regional rail", which generally refers to services midway between commuter rail and intercity rail that are not primarily commuter-oriented.

Some transit lines in the NYC metropolitan areas have commuter lines that act like a regional rail network, as lines often converge at one point and pass as a main line to the destination station. They also pass through large business areas (ie Harlem, Jamaica, Stamford, Metropark), and some lines operate every 5–10 minutes during peak hours, and roughly every 15 minutes during off hours.

Spread

The two busiest passenger rail stations in the United States are Pennsylvania Station and Grand Central Terminal, which are both located in the Borough of Manhattan in New York City, and which serve three of the four busiest commuter railroads in the United States (the Long Island Rail Road and NJ Transit at Penn Station, and the Metro-North Railroad at Grand Central Terminal). The commuter railroads serving the Chicago area are Metra (the fourth-busiest commuter railroad in the United States) and the South Shore Line. Other notable commuter railroad systems include SEPTA Regional Rail (fifth-busiest in the US), serving the Philadelphia area; MBTA Commuter Rail (sixth-busiest in the US), serving the Greater Boston-Providence area; Caltrain, serving the area south of San Francisco along the peninsula as far as San Jose; and Metrolink, serving the 5-county Los Angeles area.

There are only three commuter rail agencies in Canada: GO Transit in Toronto (the fifth-busiest in North America), Exo in Montreal (eight-busiest in North America), and West Coast Express in Vancouver. The two busiest rail stations in Canada are Union Station in Toronto and Central Station in Montreal.

Commuter rail networks outside of densely populated urban areas like the Washington D.C., New York, Chicago, Philadelphia, Boston, San Francisco, Montreal, and Toronto metropolitan areas have historically been sparse. Since the 1990s, however, several commuter rail projects have been proposed and built throughout the United States, especially in the Sun Belt and other regions characterized by urban sprawl that have traditionally been underserved by public transportation. Since then, commuter rail networks have been inaugurated in Dallas–Fort Worth, Los Angeles, San Diego, Minneapolis, Denver, Salt Lake City, and Orlando, among other cities. Several more commuter rail projects have been proposed and are in the planning stages.

Rolling stock
Commuter trains are either powered by diesel-electric or electric locomotives, or else use self-propelled cars (some systems, such as the New York area's Metro-North Railroad, use both). A few systems, particularly around New York City, use electric power, supplied by a third rail and/or overhead catenary wire, which provides quicker acceleration, lower noise, and fewer air-quality issues. Philadelphia's SEPTA Regional Rail uses exclusively electric power, supplied by overhead catenary wire.

Diesel-electric locomotives based on the EMD F40PH design as well as the MP36PH-3C are popular as motive power for commuter trains. Manufacturers of coaches include Bombardier, Kawasaki, Nippon Sharyo, and Hyundai Rotem. A few systems use diesel multiple unit vehicles, including WES Commuter Rail near Portland and Austin's Capital MetroRail. These systems use vehicles supplied by Stadler Rail or US Railcar (formerly Colorado Railcar).

List of North American commuter rail operators

List of under construction and planned systems
There are several commuter rail systems currently under construction or in development in Canada, Mexico and the United States.

Former
The following systems have ceased operations since the formation of Amtrak in 1971.
CalTrain, Oxnard to Los Angeles (1982–1983)
Champlain Flyer, Burlington, Vermont (2000–2003)
Cleveland commuter rail, former Erie-Lackawanna, later Conrail, service between Cleveland and Youngstown, Ohio (until 1977)
Former Milwaukee Road service from Milwaukee to Watertown, Wisconsin (until 1972)
OnTrack, Syracuse, New York (1994–2007)
Parkway Limited, Pittsburgh, PA (1981)
PATrain, Pittsburgh, PA (1979–1989)
Penn Central, Calumet service between Chicago and Valparaiso, Indiana (until 1979 when service was commuted to Amtrak)
Pittsburgh and Lake Erie Railroad service from Pittsburgh to Beaver Falls, Pennsylvania (until 1985)
SEMTA, Detroit, Michigan (1974–1983)
City rail, La Ceiba, Honduras (until 2006)
FENADESAL service from San Salvador to Soyapango and Apopa, El Salvador (?–2000, 2004–2005, 2007–2013)

See also

 Interurban
 List of airport circulators
 List of metro systems
 List of suburban and commuter rail systems
 List of rail transit systems in the United States
 List of tram and light rail transit systems
 List of United States commuter rail systems by ridership
 Northeast Corridor
 Public transport
 Regional rail
 Transit (transportation)
 Transportation in New York City

Notes

References

Commuter rail in the United States
Passenger rail transport in Canada
Passenger rail transportation in Mexico